Willmann is a surname. Notable persons with that name include:

 Caroline Willmann (1796–1860), German singer
 Emma Willmann (born 1985), American stand-up comedian and actress
 George J. Willmann (1897–1977), US-born Jesuit priest in the Philippines
 Magdalena Willmann (1771–1801), German singer
 Marianne Willmann (1768–1813), German singer
 Maximilian Willmann (1767–1813), German cellist
 Michael Willmann (1630–1706), German painter
 Walburga Willmann (1769–1835), German pianist

See also
 Willman

German-language surnames